Hami Mandıralı (born 20 July 1968) is a Turkish football manager and former footballer. He played for Trabzonspor nearly all of his career.

Club career
Mandıralı was born in Arsin, Trabzon, Turkey. joined Trabzonspor aged 10, and continued on to make his professional debut in 1985, aged 17. He quickly established himself as one of the most consistent finishers of his time. He became a regular in the Turkey national team, and was always near the top of the goalscorers charts. Mandıralı proved his reputation was deserved by scoring many goals in European competition. In all, he scored 23 goals in European football.
 
Mandıralı was particularly famous for his free-kicks, from which he scored many times in his career. He did not try and curl the ball, like most of his more illustrious colleagues in the art of scoring free-kicks. Instead, he would unleash thunderous shots that would fly past or through walls and leave the goalkeeper standing motionless. In this manner his  style is similar with Roberto Carlos.

He had an extremely powerful shot, being able to easily surpass 140 km/h. Very hard shots include the free kick against San Marino in 1997 and the halfway goal against 1860 Munich, this one surprisingly powerful (over 173 km/h). He scored many times from long and very long range, even over 40 m.

In 1998, he joined the German club Schalke 04 for DM7 million (€3.5 million), but remained there for one year only. He was transferred back to Trabzonspor in the 1999–2000 season for a sum of €2.25 million. Upon his return, he regained his position as top marksman, consistently ending each season as the club's top scorer. In 2002, he was let go by the chairman Özkan Sümer. There was a good deal of bad feeling about his departure, and it is not widely known what caused the split. Mandıralı moved to Ankaragücü, but did not stay long. He retired soon after, having never won the league championship.

International goals

Managing career
On 1 July 2008, Mandıralı was appointed on a two-years contract manager of the Turkey under-21 side.

Statistics

Achievements
Some of his achievements include:
World rank (1888–2008): 206th by 222 goals in 499 matches in Turkey and Germany,
Third most goals scored in Turkish league history (219),
Most goals scored in European cups (23 at Trabzonspor),
8 goals in 40 games for the Turkish national football team.
Played 558 games for Trabzonspor, the most by any player.

Honours

Club
Trabzonspor
Turkish Cup: 1991–92, 1994–95
Turkish Super Cup: 1995

External links

References

Living people
1968 births
Sportspeople from Trabzon
Association football midfielders
Association football forwards
Trabzonspor footballers
FC Schalke 04 players
MKE Ankaragücü footballers
Bundesliga players
Expatriate footballers in Germany
Turkish expatriate footballers
Turkish footballers
UEFA Euro 1996 players
Turkey international footballers
Turkish expatriate sportspeople in Germany
Süper Lig players
Turkey national football team managers
Turkey under-21 international footballers
Turkey youth international footballers
Süper Lig managers
Turkish football managers